Morillot is a surname. Notable people with the surname include:

Juliette Morillot (born 1959), French journalist
Roland Morillot (1885–1915), French naval officer
 French ship Roland Morillot

French-language surnames
fr:Morillot